The Dibbs ministry may refer to one of the three ministries of George Dibbs, Premier of New South Wales:

Dibbs ministry (1885) — first ministry
Dibbs ministry (1889) — second ministry
Dibbs ministry (1891–94) — third ministry